Stark Raving Black is a stand-up comedy film starring Lewis Black and directed by Adam Dubin. The 80 minute show was filmed in HD and 5.1 Surround Sound in Detroit, Michigan at The Fillmore Detroit on August 2, 2009. In the film, Black discusses politics and current events from the state of the economy to alternative energy. The DVD has 70 minutes of unedited and uncensored content, which is 40 minutes more than the television special.

Album 

Stark Raving Black is the seventh album by comedian Lewis Black, released through Comedy Central Records. Containing the audio of a concert stand-up special of the same name. The album was awarded the 2011 Grammy Award for Best Comedy Album.

Track listing
"Expectations" – 4:52
"Democrats & Republicans" – 3:26
"Mainstream Comedian" – 1:43
"Vince Gill, Amy Grant, & Me" – 12:03
"Hitting 60" – 5:30
"Birth & Death" – 8:49
"Parents" – 9:07
"The Economy" – 5:36
"Greed" – 9:04
"Alternative Energy" – 4:27
"Hope" – 12:40

References

External links
 
 
 Fox Business Press Article on Stark Raving Black
 CNBC Press Article on Stark Raving Black
 NY Times review
 LA Times review
 Washington Post review
 Reuters review

2009 films
American comedy films
2010 live albums
Comedy Central Records live albums
Stand-up comedy albums
Grammy Award for Best Comedy Album
Stand-up comedy concert films
2010s comedy albums
2010s spoken word albums
Spoken word albums by American artists
Live spoken word albums
2000s English-language films
2000s American films